Goulbourn Township, Ontario, was formed in 1818, roughly 20 km southwest of downtown Ottawa, with the first major settlement occurring in Richmond.  Other communities in the township include Stittsville, Munster, and Ashton.  Stittsville is the largest community in the township, owing in part to its proximity to Kanata and the Queensway.  The township was amalgamated into the current City of Ottawa in 2001.

According to the Canada 2001 Census:
Population: 23,604 (approx. 39,250 with original boundaries)
% Change (1996-2001): 22.5
Dwellings: 7,975
Area (km².): 271.32
Density (persons per km².): 87.0
At the 2006 census the population of Goulbourn had increased to 28,583.
At the 2011 census, the population had increased to 36,320.
At the 2016 census, the population had increased to 40,010.

Three quarters of the population (30,032) live in Stittsville. Richmond has a population of 4,833  (4,055 in the population centre) and the remaining 5,145 live in rural parts of the Township.

Goulbourn took its name from Henry Goulburn, Undersecretary of State for War and the Colonies from 1812 to 1826.

Reeves 
1850 Thomas Garland
1858 J. Sumner
1860 T. McCaffrey
1861 John Scott
1867 C.M. Church
1868 Hiram Stykes
1869 Robinson Lyon
1870 Hiram Sykes
1871 Robinson Lyon
1873 John Scott
1874 Robinson Lyon
1875 Neil Stewart
1885 John Kemp
1887 H.G. Cowan
1895 John C. Bradley
1897 n/a (1897-1906 County Council was composed of division representatives, not reeves)
1907 S.A. Jinkinson
1909 George Llewellyn
1920 R. Sample
1924 T. Alfred Bradley
1925 R.N. Sample
1932 J.W. Patrick
1935 Norman McCaffrey
1951 H. Spearman
1959 Alan R. Simpson
1962 Albert Argue (died in 1964, term completed by Reginald Faulkner)
1965 Reginald Faulkner
1967 Garnet Bradley
1972 Clarence Maheral

Mayors 
Goulbourn amalgamated with Stittsville and Richmond on January 1, 1974.

1974-1981 Betty Hill
1982-1991 Anton Wytenburg
1992-1996 Paul Bradley
1997-2001 Janet Stavinga

See also
List of townships in Ontario

References

External links
  - Early Settlers in Goulbourn Township - bytown.net

Populated places established in 1888
Former municipalities now in Ottawa
Former township municipalities in Ontario
Populated places disestablished in 2000